Tibet is a region in East Asia covering much of the Tibetan Plateau that is currently administered by People's Republic of China as the Tibet Autonomous Region and claimed by the Republic of China as the Tibet Area and the Central Tibetan Administration. The CTA uses the snow lion flag of the independent Tibetan state from 1912 to 1951. The snow lion flag has become a pro-independence symbol and is outlawed in the People's Republic of China after the 1959 Tibetan uprising. The PRC uses its national flag instead to represent Tibet.

Flag used by the independent Tibet and the Central Tibetan Administration

The flag of Tibet, also known as the "Snow Lion flag" (gangs seng dar cha), was used by the de facto independent polity of Tibet from 1916 to 1951. It was adopted by the 13th Dalai Lama in 1916 and used until 1959. While the Tibetan flag is illegal in Tibet today, it continues to be used by the Central Tibetan Administration, based in Dharamshala in India.

The Government of the People's Republic of China considers it to be a symbol of separatism; however, the Dalai Lama, the spiritual leader of the Tibetan people, said in recent years that he hoped that Tibet would achieve true autonomy and would not ask for independence. He believes that the symbolism of the flag is similar to that of the Hong Kong regional flag and does not represent the Tibetan independence movement, but the concept of pursuing religious freedom and pursuing national equality and mutual respect.

Symbolism 

According to the Central Tibetan Administration, the flag has the following symbolism:
The white triangle at the center of the flag symbolises a snow-clad mountain. 
The six red stripes exist atop a blue sky representing the original ancestors of the Tibetan people: the six tribes called Se, Mu, Dong, Tong, Dru, and Ra.
The yellow sun represents the equal enjoyment of freedom, spiritual and material happiness and prosperity by all beings in Tibet. 
The pair of snow lions represent Tibet’s victorious accomplishment of a unified spiritual and secular life. 
The three-coloured jewel held by the snow lions represent the three "supreme gems," the objects of refuge: Buddha, Dharma and Sangha. 
The two coloured swirling jewel held between the two lions represents the people’s guarding and cherishing of the self discipline of correct ethical behaviour. 
The flag’s yellow border symbolises that the teachings of the Buddha are flourishing and spreading.

Flag used by the People's Republic of China

 
As the People's Republic of China took over Tibet in 1951, the PRC has outlawed the Snow Lion flag after the 1959 Tibetan uprising and has used its national flag in the Tibet Autonomous Region to represent Tibet. It contains a Chinese red field with five golden stars charged at the canton. The design features one large star, with four smaller stars in an arc set off towards the fly.

Design and early use 

In February 1913, shortly after the fall of the Qing dynasty, the 13th Dalai Lama, Tibet's political and spiritual leader, declared independence from China and began modernising the Tibetan army. According to Tsarong Dasang Dadul, the commander-in-chief of the modern Tibetan army, in 1916, a new national flag was adopted by the Dalai Lama and all army regiments were ordered to carry the flag in its present form. Gyalten Namgyal, tailor to both the 13th and 14th Dalai Lamas wrote, "When I was fourteen, the Dalai Lama decided he wanted a Tibetan national flag made, and designed it himself. When a prototype was approved and the first flag commissioned, I was the one to execute the work."

In addition to being carried by Tibet's army, the flag was displayed on public buildings of the Ganden Phodrang government. Historical footage shows the flag flying at the foot of the Potala Palace, the site of the Dalai Lama's government in Tibet. The snow lion flag motif was also used on a flag seen by English diplomat, Sir Eric Teichman, flying above a Tibetan government building during the 1917–1918 hostilities between Sichuan and Tibet: "Over the Kalon Lama’s residence... floats the banner of Tibet, a yellow flag bearing a device like a lion in green, with a white snow mountain and a sun and moon in the corner."

Outside of Tibet, the flag was featured in publications by foreign governments, reference books, academic journals, and in culturally significant works up until 1959. One of its first official international appearances was in a British Crown publication in 1923, "Drawings of the Flags in Use at the Present Time by Various Nations". It was also included in the German Ministry of Defense's Naval Command, "Flaggenbuch," in 1926 and in the Italian Naval Ministry's "Raccolta delle Bandiere Fiamme e Insegne in uso presso le Diverse Nazioni" in 1934. National Geographic Magazine featured the flag in their 1934 “Flags of the World” edition. The caption reads, "Tibet.- With its towering mountain of snow, before which stand two lions fighting for a flaming gem, the flag of Tibet is one of the most distinctive of the East." Beginning in 1928, images of the flag were also widely published by companies in Europe, North America, South America, the Middle East, and Oceania in national flag collections on various forms of trading cards.

The flag's first appearance at an international gathering was in March–April 1947 at the Asian Relations Conference in New Delhi. The Conference, organised by Pandit Jawaharlal Nehru, hosted Asian states and anti-colonial movements. The representative of the British government of India in Lhasa, Hugh Richardson, personally shared the invitation from the Indian Council of World Affairs with the Tibetan Foreign Office and advised that the conference was a good opportunity to show Asia and the world that Tibet was de facto an independent country. At the conference, leaders of each of the thirty-two delegations sat on a dais behind a plate with the name and flag of their country. American historian A. Tom Grunfeld asserts that the conference was not government-sponsored, and so Tibet's and the Tibetan flag's presence had "no diplomatic significance", adding that the flag was removed after representatives from the Republic of China protested to conference organisers who then issued a statement that Jawaharlal Nehru had invited the Tibetan delegates "in a personal capacity". A Tibetan delegate who attended the conference claims that this did not occur and the only existing photos from the conference show the flag displayed along with other participating countries' flags.

After the People’s Liberation Army invaded Tibet and the 17-Point Agreement was signed, the flag continued to be used in the 1950s under the Chinese government, although the flag's status was unclear. Many in the Chinese Communist Party felt that the usage of the flag indicated separatism, but the Tibetan local government at the time stressed that the flag was an army flag (the Tibetan army continued to exist parallel to People's Liberation Army infantries) and not a national flag. Phuntso Wangye claims that Mao Zedong discussed the flag in 1955 conversation with the 14th Dalai Lama. According to the story, Mao told the Dalai Lama that Zhang Jingwu, Zhang Guohua, and Fan Ming told him that Tibet had a "national flag". The Dalai Lama replied that Tibet had an army flag. Reportedly, Mao replied that "you may keep your national flag". There is no official recognition of this conversation by the Chinese government however.

During this period before 1959, the flag continued to be recognised internationally as a national flag in reference books and by foreign governments. When the Dalai Lama visited the Himalayan kingdom of Sikkim in 1956 the Tibetan flag was used by the Sikkimese government to welcome him. The flag can be seen in historic footage flying on the same flagpole alongside the flag of Sikkim at the Chogyal’s Tsuklakhang Palace and on the Dalai Lama’s motorcade provided by the royal family.

American anthropologist Melvyn Goldstein argues that while the Tibetan flag was used by the army, few Tibetans in Tibet knew about it so when they wanted to protest against the Chinese government, they would use the flag of Chushi Gangdruk instead. Tibetan historian, Jamyang Norbu, has challenged this assertion citing incidents of the Tibetan public’s regard for the flag as their national symbol.

Pro-independence symbol 
After the 1959 Tibetan Uprising, the 14th Dalai Lama left his position as Ruler of Tibet, denounced the 17-Point Agreement with the PRC, and established the exile Central Tibetan Administration in India. As part of his project to inculcate pan-Tibetan nationalism (of all Tibetan people and not just those in his previous domain of the Tibet Autonomous Region), he standardised and adopted symbols as nationalist symbols, such as the Lhasa dialect of Tibetan, a Tibetan national anthem, and the flag. The flag is popularly known as the Snow Lion flag due to the presence of the two snow lions. The flag was adopted as a symbol of the Tibetan independence movement, and has become known as the "Free Tibet flag". Through the diaspora's and international protesters' use of the flag, it became known and used in protest by the Tibetan public. The flag is banned in mainland China.

Flag emoji 
The flag of Tibet does not have its own emoji. Tibetan activists unsuccessfully petitioned the Unicode Consortium for a Tibet flag emoji in 2019. Wired noted that Taiwan, where China's sovereignty is also challenged, has an emoji for its flag. However, Wired also noted that a Tibetan flag emoji may open a Pandora's box of similar requests from other unrecognised states and independence movements.

Controversy 

In 2012, Tibetan Prime Minister Lobsang Sangay was photographed with the flag of Tibet in Ladakh, India, prompting the Chinese government to issue a statement criticising the public display of the flag. The Indian government had previously promised the Chinese government that it would not allow anti-China political activities by Tibetan exiles on Indian territory.

See also 

 Emblem of Tibet
 Tibetan Army
 Snow Lion
 Flag of East Turkestan
 Tibet flag case

References

External links 

National symbols of Tibet
Tibetan independence movement
Tibet
Tibet
Tibet
1916 introductions
Flags displaying animals
Flags introduced in 1916